The bodo blouse, locally known as Baju Bodo, is a sheer and transparent short sleeved loose blouse, a traditional costume for women of the Bugis and Makassar peoples of South Sulawesi, Indonesia. A bodo blouse is traditionally combined with a matching woven sarong that covered the waist below the body.

Costume components

Blouse
The textile materials used in bodo blouse are usually thin, sheer and transparent; usually muslin, sheer cotton or silk. Muslin is the most favoured materials, it has loose threads that make it look transparent and suitable for hot and humid tropical climate. 

As the name implies, the term bodo in Bugis language means "short", which imply that this blouse is indeed short sleeved. The cut of bodo blouse is quite simple, it follows the square design with holes or openings for neck, two arms and waist. Some design might has front opening, while others do not which resembles a loose tube. It also quite loose to allow the blouse to fit all sizes, and the design did emphasize the drape quality of the sheer fabrics.

Sarong
Bodo blouse is traditionally combined with a matching woven sarong that covered the waist. Commonly, Buginese people wore sarong wrapped around quite tightly. However, in this outfit the sarong is deliberately fitted loosely to match the loose draped shape of the bodo blouse top.

Jewelry
This traditional clothing is considered incomplete if not complemented by jewelry or accessories. Some of these accessories includes earrings, headbands, tiaras, tiered necklaces, long necklaces, wide bracelets, multiple thin keroncong type bracelets and metal belts. The accessories mentioned above are the complete variants which are commonly used by brides. Common guests usually wear less jewelry. This jewelry is usually made of gold or silver, while the simpler ones are made of brass.

History

The sheer woven cotton as the materials of bodo blouse is believed has been made and used by people in Sulawesi since the 9th century. In the past, bodo blouse were worn without undergarments, thus it exposed the breasts and curves of its wearer. However, after the conversion of local Bugis and Makassar people to Islam in past centuries, the clothes that previously quite revealing was subdued to be more modest. This transparent outfit was then paired with undergarment of the same colour, but usually lighter in tone.

Usage
This traditional clothing is often worn for traditional events, such as wedding ceremonies. Although it has been increasingly marginalised due to the influence of modern clothing, or competing with other Indonesian national costumes such as kebaya and baju kurung, it remains prevalent in traditional Bugis villages. The bodo blouses are still worn by Bugis women, especially by brides during the marriage ceremony and wedding reception, as well as by the mother of the bride and groom, and the maid of honour.  

Lately, the use of the bodo blouse has begun to expand for various activities, such as dancing and singing. Today, bodo blouse has become a source of inspiration for contemporary Indonesian fashion designers, and used as the inspiration of modern wedding dress.

Colours

Traditional
According to Bugis customs and traditions, specific colours of bodo blouse worn by Bugis women indicates the age and social standings of the wearer.

Contemporary
Today, the shades are no longer confined to a person's age or status. Thus, it is now a fair practice for a woman to dressed under the colours that historically being reserved for the younger groups. 

Additionally, new cast of palettes, such as blue, mauve and orange are also incorporated on the textile. Materials from Leiden Museum identified that blue and mauve-tonned blouses are already available in 1864, potentially worn only by members of nobility before later being adopted by the commoners. Presently, a green Baju Bodo is also an acceptable choice to be fashioned by a commoner bride.

Gallery

See also

 Kebaya
 Baju kurung
 National costume of Indonesia

References

Indonesian clothing
Bugis people
South Sulawesi
Makassar